Agathotoma kirshi is a species of sea snail, a marine gastropod mollusc in the family Mangeliidae.

Distribution
This species occurs in the Caribbean Sea and off the Bahamas

References

 Rolán E., Fernández-Garcés E. & Redfern C. (2012) New records and description of four new species of the genus Agathotoma (Gastropoda, Mangeliidae) in the Caribbean. Novapex 13(2): 45-62

External links
 

kirshi
Gastropods described in 2012